Inti Rumi (Quechua inti sun or Inti sun god, rumi stone, "sun (or Inti) stone") is a mountain in the Bolivian Andes which reaches a height of approximately . It is located in the Chuquisaca Department, Oropeza Province, Sucre Municipality.

References 

Mountains of Chuquisaca Department